Secondcreek is an unincorporated community in Monroe County, West Virginia, United States. Secondcreek is northeast of Union. The ZIP code for Secondcreek is 24974; however the post office was closed in 2010.

The community was named after nearby Second Creek.

Resource and Heritage 
Second Creek is an excellent trout stream although the native brook trout is in greatly reduced numbers compared to the brown trout and rainbow trout recently introduced.  Rodgers Mill is a fly fishing only site. Second Creek is stocked every April.  Fly anglers can access the waters using County Route 219/3 and County Route 3/7 from US Route 219.

At one time in its history, more than twenty mills for powder, grist, lumbering and finishing were on this creek.

Reed's Mill and the Nickell Homestead and Mill are listed on the National Register of Historic Places.

References

External links
  Second Creek is directly served by its watershed, "Friends of the Second Creek"
  Second Creek is a tributary of the Greenbrier River.  Its watershed is called the Greenbrier River Watershed Association.  Thanks to the contribution of waterbodys like Second Creek, the Greenbrier comprises about 30% of the New River's volume.
  The Greenbrier River is a major tributary for the New River watershed.

Unincorporated communities in Monroe County, West Virginia
Unincorporated communities in West Virginia